Callie duPerier (born March 17, 1993) is an American professional rodeo cowgirl who specializes in barrel racing. In December 2015, she won the Women’s Professional Rodeo Association (WPRA) barrel racing world championship at the National Finals Rodeo (NFR) in Las Vegas, Nevada.

Life
Callie duPerier was born on March 17, 1993, in San Antonio, Texas. She currently resides in Boerne, Texas. She attended Schreiner University (Kerriville). duPerier grew up in Bandera, Texas. She is a dedicated horse person. She married Kaleb Apffel in May 2016.

Career
duPerier joined the Women's Professional Rodeo Association in 1993.

2014 and earlier seasons

In 2014, she finished the season ranked 25th in the year with $44, 804. In 2010, she won the WPRA Junior World title with $14.476 aboard Makearocket Buzz "Fuzzy". duPere received an invitation to The American Rodeo more than once. She also has been competing in barrel racing since she was 12 years old.

2015 season
In 2015, she won the World Barrel Racing Championship at the NFR on her horse Dillion. She finished the season with $303,846 in earnings. She also won the NFR Average with a total time of 140.41 seconds on 10 runs. She made qualified runs in 6 out of 10 runs to win $126,923 total at the NFR.

Other rodeos she won this season include the Champions Challenge Finale in Omaha, Nebraska; the Yellowstone River Round-Up in Billings, Montana; the Champions Challenge in Pueblo, Colorado; the Molalla, Oregon, Buckaroo Rodeo; the St. Paul, Oregon, Rodeo where she set a new record; the Jasper, Texas, Lions Benefit Rodeo; and the Champions Challenge in Kissimmee, Florida. She finished second at the New Mexico State Fair and Rodeo in Albuquerque, New Mexico, and at the Farm City Pro Rodeo in Hermiston, Oregon.

2016 season
In 2016, she finished the season with $4,773.

Horses
In 2015, her horse, registered name Rare Dillion, nicknamed Dillion, was awarded the WPRA Horse with the Most Heart. In 2017, Dillion was a 17-year-old buckskin gelding by Firecracker and out of Rare Class, who is a daughter of Dash Ta Diamonds. Dash Ta Diamonds is nicknamed Arson and is an 11-year-old sorrel gelding as of 2019. He is by Dash Ta Fame out of The Millennium Star.

References

Bibliography

External links 
 Women's Professional Rodeo Association
 Professional Rodeo Cowboys Association
 National Finals Rodeo
 Callie DuPerier Wins It All - NFR Barrel Racing 2015 YouTube Video
 2015 NFR - Barrel Racing - Callie DuPerier - All Round YouTube Video

1993 births
Living people
Sportspeople from San Antonio
People from Boerne, Texas
American barrel racers
American female equestrians
21st-century American women